Jægerspris Castle, in Jægerspris on the  Hornsherred peninsula west of Copenhagen, is a Danish manor house. It has belonged to the Danish monarchs for most of its history which dates back to the 13th century. In the 1850s it became a retreat for King Frederik VII and his morganatic wife  Countess Danner, who sought refuge there to escape the controversy their marriage had caused among the establishment in Copenhagen. After the king's death, Countess Danner turned it into an asylum for women.

Today the castle serves as a historic house museum and is also noted for its park.

History

Abrahamstrup
Until 1677 the estate was known as Abrahamstrup. It is not clear who Abraham was but the name is believed to be a reference to King Valdemar II's son Abel since most of Hornsherred in the 12th century was owned by the king. A source from 1318 refers to the estate as land belonging to the Crown.

In 1673 the castle passed into private ownership when it was acquired by jægermester Vincents von Hahn. In 1677 he renamed it Jægerspris, which literally translates to Hunter's Praise.

Prince Charles and his expansion

In 1679, the castle passed back into royal ownership and shortly after Frederick IV's ascent to the throne in 1699, he used it as a summer residence for a few years but then gave it to his younger brother Prince Charles of Denmark in 1703. Prince Charles carried out a comprehensive expansion and rebuilding of the castle. The south wing was extended with an extra storey and the single, square guard tower of the southern facade of the castle was given a twin tower to the east to add symmetry to the building. Several buildings associated with the forestry and agricultural operations of the estate were also built on the grounds. They included a pheasantry and a stud farm. The adaptions of the castle were completed in 1722. In 1726, three years before Prince Charles' death, the stud farm relocated to Vemmetofte, one of his other estates.

Hunting palace of the Oldenburgs

After Prince Charles' death in 1729, Crown Prince Christian (VI) took over the estate. Thereafter the castle continued to serve as a hunting lodge for the Danish monarchs until it was ceded to the Danish state in 1849 in connection with the adoption of the Danish Constitution.

Frederik VII and Countess Danner

King Frederik VII acquired Jægerspris Castle on 21 April 1854, the birthday of his morganatic wife Countess Danner, as a place to spend their private life, away from the controversy their liaison had caused back in Copenhagen. They carried out a major renovation of the castle assisted by the architect Johan Henrik Nebelong.

After Frederick's death in 1863, Louise lived a discreet life there. In 1866 she opened part of the castle to the public as a historic house museum where everything was left exactly the way it was, thus commemorating the popular king and their lives together.

In 1873, she founded the Frederick VII's Foundation for Poor Women from the Working Class, and the house was called "The Danner House". On her death,  she left Jægerspris Castle "to the benefit of poor and destitute servant girls".

Park
In the years around 1770 the sculptor Johannes Wiedewelt erected a large number of monuments in the park commemorating famous Danish and Norwegian men and women. There are 54 monuments in the park and the adjacent forest, Slotshegnet.

The park also contains Countess Danner's burial mound and Herman Wilhelm Bissen's bust of Frederik VII.

The large oak trees in the southern section of the park were planted by Frederik V to ensure the availability of timber for naval construction. To the north there are avenues of lime trees.

Transport
From Copenhagen there is an S-train to Frederikssund, and from there bus 316 connects to Jaegerspris with a bus stop at the castle or 230R with a bus stop close to the castle (500 meters)

Gallery

References

Houses completed in 1722
Castles in Denmark
Royal residences in Denmark
Baroque architecture in Denmark
Listed buildings and structures in Frederikssund Municipality
Listed castles and manor houses in Denmark
Historic house museums in Denmark
Hunting lodges in Denmark
Museums in the Capital Region of Denmark
Houses in Frederikssund Municipality
1722 establishments in Denmark